The women's high jump event at the 2007 Summer Universiade was held on 11–13 August.

Medalists

Results

Qualification

Final

References
Results
Final results

High
2007 in women's athletics
2007